Ed Negre (July 16, 1927June 4, 2014) was a NASCAR Winston Cup Series driver who raced from 1955 to 1979.

Career
His total career earnings were US$344,180. While his average starting position was 24th place, 22nd was Negre's average finishing position. #8 was the number that he would use the most often. He is famous for fielding the first Cup ride for Dale Earnhardt in the No. 8 car at the 1975 World 600. However, he would also get the most DNFs (37) while competing in the No. 8 machine. Negre got 44 finishes in the top-twenty while competing in the No. 8 car.

Motorsports career results

NASCAR
(key) (Bold – Pole position awarded by qualifying time. Italics – Pole position earned by points standings or practice time. * – Most laps led.)

Grand National Series

Winston Cup Series

Daytona 500

References

External links
 
 

1927 births
2014 deaths
NASCAR drivers
People from Kelso, Washington
Racing drivers from Washington (state)